Peoples National Bank and Trust Company Building is a historic bank building located at White Plains, Westchester County, New York. It was built in 1929 and is a nine-story commercial building in the Classical Revival style.  It has an L-shaped plan and features highly finished limestone and brick materials and terra cotta ornament at the street level.  Above the two-story base, the building remaining stories are built of brick with limestone trim.

It was added to the National Register of Historic Places in 2000.

See also
National Register of Historic Places listings in southern Westchester County, New York

References

Buildings and structures in White Plains, New York
Bank buildings on the National Register of Historic Places in New York (state)
Neoclassical architecture in New York (state)
Office buildings completed in 1929
National Register of Historic Places in Westchester County, New York